Bujak is a Polish surname that may refer to
Eugenia Bujak (born 1989), Polish cyclist
Franciszek Bujak (1875–1953), Polish historian
Józef Bujak (1898–1949), Polish cross-country skier 
Philip Bujak (born 1960), British educationalist
Sabahudin Bujak (born 1959), Bosnian-Herzegovinian football player and coach
Zbigniew Bujak (born 1954), Polish electrician and trade union activist

See also
 

Polish-language surnames